Blow-Up is a DJ duo from California.

History
Claudio Camaione and Paolo Cilione came to New York City in the late 1990s, then further on to Southern California to build their studio for recording and film editing in a villa overlooking Silver Lake. At the start of their collaboration they scored a few short films and started directing indie pieces of their own featuring Clifton Collins from Traffic, NYC "It Girl" Debi Mazar and Italian starlet Claudia Gerini. In 2003, under the name Blow-Up, they wrote, produced, performed & recorded their debut American LP Exploding Plastic Pleasure. Packed with rhythmic fueled compositions, club remixes and songs in no less than 4 different languages, the LP features guest performances by Debbie Harry, Lydia Lunch and Dee Dee Ramone. This gained them a reputation in the pop and dance music world resulting in requests to write, produce and remix for several up and coming acts as well as some of the top names in music.

The Flaming Lips chose Blow-Up to remix Ego Tripping and Madonna commissioned them to remix her Hollywood single for the American Life Remixed LP. After that project was cancelled, they remixed Love Profusion instead. More recently, they've completed remixes for Yoko Ono, Esthero, Blondie as well as Rod Stewart for a 25-year anniversary release of Da Ya Think I'm Sexy.

Three of these remixes—Madonna's Love Profusion, Esthero's O.G. Bitch, and Yoko Ono's Everyman/Everywoman reached #1 on the Billboard dance chart in 2004. The Rod Stewart remix is currently charting as well.

Original Productions
 2003 – In Technicolor
 2004 – Exploding Plastic Pleasure

Remixes
 2003 – The Flaming Lips, Ego Tripping EP
 2003 – Madonna, Love Profusion
 2003 – Blondie, Good Boys
 2004 – Esthero, O.G. Bitch
 2004 – Yoko Ono, Everyman...Everywoman...
 2004 – Rod Stewart, Do You Think I'm Sexy
 2005 – Madonna, Hollywood
 2008 – Alanis Morissette, Not as We

External links
 Official Website
 Myspace Page

American DJs